The ZX Microdrive is a magnetic-tape data storage system launched in July 1983 by Sinclair Research for its ZX Spectrum home computer. It was proposed as a faster-loading alternative to the cassette and cheaper than a floppy disk, but it suffered from poor reliability and lower speed.

Microdrives used tiny cartridges containing a  endless loop of magnetic tape, which held a minimum of 85 kB and performed a complete circuit in approximately eight seconds.

The Microdrive technology was later also used in the Sinclair QL and ICL One Per Desk personal computers.

Development 

It is claimed the Microdrive concept was originally suggested by Andrew Grillet at an interview with Sinclair Research in 1974. Grillet proposed "a version of the Learjet Stereo 8 system, modified to allow two 64k core images per track for roll-out roll-in swapping using the KUTS protocol". Grillet was offered a better-paying job at Xerox, and never worked for Sinclair Research. Development of the ZX Microdrive hardware by Sinclair engineers Jim Westwood, David Southward and Ben Cheese started in 1982.

Products 

The Microdrive was comparatively cheap (£49.95 at launch) and technologically innovative but also rather limited. Connecting a ZX Microdrive to a ZX Spectrum required the ZX Interface 1 unit, costing £49.95, although this could be bought packaged with a Microdrive for £79.95. Later, in March 1985, the ZX Spectrum Expansion System was launched for £99.95. This consisted of Interface 1, a Microdrive, a blank cartridge and several cartridges containing Tasword Two (a word processor), Masterfile (a database), Quicksilva's Games Designer and Ant Attack games, and an introductory cartridge.

Technology 

The cartridges held a minimum of 85 kB when formatted on a ZX Microdrive (exact capacity depended on the number of "bad" sectors found and the precise speed of the Microdrive motor when formatting). The data retrieval rate was 15 kB/s, i.e., 120 kbit/s. It was possible to "expand" the capacity of a fresh microdrive cartridge by formatting it several times. This caused the tape to stretch slightly, increasing the length of the tape loop, so that more sectors can be marked out on it. This procedure was widely documented in the Sinclair community magazines of the 1980s.

A total of eight ZX Microdrive units could be connected to the Interface 1 by daisy chaining one drive to the next via an electrical connector block.

The system acquired a reputation for unreliability. The tapes stretched during use (giving them a short life span), eventually rendering the data stored unreadable. Also the "write protection" was software-based, thus a computer crash could erase the data on an entire tape in 8 seconds. The cartridges were relatively expensive (initially sold for £4.95 each, later reduced to £1.99).

Later uses 

Microdrives were also used as the native storage medium of the Sinclair QL, which incorporated two internal drives. These were very similar to the ZX Microdrive, but used a different logical format, allowing each cartridge to hold at least 100 kB. Mechanically the drives were similar, however, they ran slightly slower and had a take-up acceleration start instead of the instant start of the ZX Spectrum drives, putting less strain on the cartridges. The QL also included a Microdrive expansion bus, allowing the attachment of up to six external QL Microdrives. These were never produced, probably due to lack of demand.  It was, however, possible to connect ZX Microdrives to a QL by putting a twist in the cable.

In addition to the QL versions, dual internal Microdrives were included in the related ICL One Per Desk system (also badged as the Merlin Tonto and Telecom Australia Computerphone). These drives were re-engineered by ICL for greater reliability, and used a format incompatible with both ZX and QL Microdrives.

See also 

 Stringy floppy
 Rotronics Wafadrive

References

External links 

 ZX Microdrive information at Planet Sinclair
 Sinclair User, April 1985, News section  

Computer storage devices
Home computer peripherals
Sinclair Research
Computer-related introductions in 1983